William Browne (1 November 1791 – 4 August 1876) was an Irish politician in the Parliament of the United Kingdom.

He was a younger son of Valentine Browne, 1st Earl of Kenmare.

He was Member of Parliament (MP) for Kerry from 1830 to 1831 and 1841 to 1847 and was appointed High Sheriff of Kerry for 1832.

He married Anne Frances, the daughter of Thomas Segrave of Dublin. They had no children.

References

External links 

1791 births
1876 deaths
Politicians from County Kerry
Members of the Parliament of the United Kingdom for County Kerry constituencies (1801–1922)
UK MPs 1830–1831
High Sheriffs of Kerry